Disclisioprocta is a genus of moths in the family Geometridae.

Species
Disclisioprocta natalata (Walker, 1862)
Disclisioprocta stellata (Guenée, 1857)

References
 Disclisioprocta at Markku Savela's Lepidoptera and Some Other Life Forms
 Natural History Museum Lepidoptera genus database

Xanthorhoini